Abdoul Said Razack Yoda (born 20 December 2000) is a Burkinabé professional footballer who plays as a midfielder for Danish 1st Division club Hobro IK.

Career

TSV Hartberg
Yoda joined Austrian Football Bundesliga club TSV Hartberg on 11 September 2020 on a two-year deal with an option for one further year from USFA in Burkina Faso. He debuted for Hartberg on 20 September in the Austrian Football Bundesliga against Wolfsberger AC.

Yoda made six appearances for Hartberg in all competitions in the 2020–21 season, with a total of 265 minutes of playing time.

Hobro IK
On 31 August 2021, after a trial period, Yoda signed a three-year deal with Danish 1st Division club Hobro IK. He made his league debut for Hobro on 10 September against Esbjerg fB.

References

External links

2000 births
Living people
Burkinabé footballers
Association football midfielders
Austrian Football Bundesliga players
Danish 1st Division players
Rail Club du Kadiogo players
US des Forces Armées players
TSV Hartberg players
Hobro IK players
Burkinabé expatriate footballers
Burkinabé expatriate sportspeople in Austria
Expatriate footballers in Austria
Burkinabé expatriate sportspeople in Denmark
Expatriate men's footballers in Denmark